Swallow was a rock band from the Boston area. Formed in 1969, they were extant for five years, touring with Traffic, the Supremes and B.B. King and headlining area venues on their own.

Somewhat unusually for a rock band, Swallow included a horn section, so there were initially eleven members in the band. Band members included Vern Miller from the Remains who wrote most of the band's songs, and blind blues singer George Leh.

Swallow released two albums on Warner Bros. Records. Their first album, Out of the Nest, released in 1972, included a contribution by Jeff Baxter on one song, "Come Home Woman". Another album, Swallow, followed in 1973.

Both albums were re-released on CD in 2010 on Wounded Bird Records.

References

American blues rock musical groups
Musical groups established in 1969
Musical groups from Boston
Warner Records artists